Alberto Morán (born Remo Andrea Domenico Recagno, Strevi, Alessandria, Italy, 15 March 1922 – Buenos Aires, 16 August 1997) was an Argentine tango musician. His works at Osvaldo Pugliese's Orchestras were notable, including songs 'Pasional', 'San José de Flores' and 'El abrojito'.

In 1958, Morán guest-starred in an episode of the CBS situation comedy Mr. Adams and Eve.
He died in 1997.

External links
 Alberto Morán at todotango.com
 Alberto Morán at tango.info

References 

Argentine tango musicians
20th-century Argentine male singers
Orquesta Osvaldo Pugliese
Tango singers
1922 births
1997 deaths
People from the Province of Alessandria
Italian emigrants to Argentina
Burials at La Chacarita Cemetery